Richmond Phiri is a Zambian chess International Master.

Chess career
He has represented his country in a number of chess olympiads, including 2006 and 2014, and won the Zambian Chess Championship in 2008 and 2014.

He played in the Chess World Cup 2015, being defeated by Hikaru Nakamura in the first round.

References

External links 

Richmond Phiri chess games at 365Chess.com

1988 births
Living people
Zambian chess players